Pindara prisca is a moth of the family Noctuidae first described by Francis Walker in 1858. It is found from Vanuatu and New Caledonia to the southern Cook Islands.

The wingspan is 23–31 mm.

The larvae feed on Decaspermum species.

References

External links
"Dysgonia prisca". Moths in Fiji. Archived September 27, 2011. With image.
"Dysgonia prisca Fruit-piercing Moth". Cook Islands Biodiversity Database. Retrieved January 23, 2020.

Catocalinae